The Pioneer Woman is a statue created by Bryant Baker in Ponca City, Oklahoma.

Pioneer Woman may also refer to:

Pioneer Woman, a statue created by Leo Friedlander for Texas Woman's University, Denton, Texas
Pioneer Woman (Littman), a statue in Portland, Oregon
The Pioneer Woman (TV series), television series that airs on Food Network
Ree Drummond, chef and host of the series
Madonna of the Trail, a series of statues created by August Leimbach
"Pioneer Women", a 1952 episode of I Love Lucy
Pioneer Woman (film), a 1973 made-for-TV movie starring Joanna Pettet, William Shatner, and David Janssen